Cray is a community including the village of Crai and the hamlet of Felin-Crai in Breconshire, Powys, Wales. The population was 241 as of the 2011 UK Census. It also includes the Cray reservoir and is mostly in the Brecon Beacons National Park.

 
Communities in Powys